Reverend John Richard Bridger (8 April 1920 – 14 July 1986) was an English cricketer. Bridger was a right-handed batsman and a leg break bowler.

Bridger was educated at Rugby School, where he played cricket for the school from 1935 to 1938. In one match in which he captained the Rugby side Bridger scored 153 runs in three hours, held four catches in the Marlborough first innings and took 5/54. Bridger later went to Clare College, Cambridge University, where as a Theology student he was exempt from military service in World War II. He was a member of the Cambridge University cricket team from 1941 to 1943, when owing to wartime restrictions university matches were not first-class. He opened the batting in the university match, a one-day match, in all three years.

Bridger made his first-class debut in 1945 for an Under-33 side against an Over-33 side at Lord's, scoring 49 in the Under-33's first innings. In 1946 he played his only first-class game for the Marylebone Cricket Club against Cambridge University, where he scored his maiden half century, making 94 runs.

Bridger became a school chaplain. He made 38 first-class appearances as an amateur for Hampshire between 1946 and 1954, playing in the holidays. He made his County Championship debut for Hampshire in 1946 against local rivals Sussex, scoring 50. In the next match, which followed immediately, against Middlesex, he scored his maiden first-class century with a score of 142 after Hampshire had followed on 219 behind. Those were his only two matches for the season. Wisden commented that "in the two matches he took part he showed himself a player of class".

Bridger's second century came in 1953 when he made 61 and 102 not out against Worcestershire. In 1954 he was awarded his County Cap, and captained the side in his last five first-class matches in August. In his 38 first-class matches for the club, he scored 1,725 runs at an average of 27.82, with a highest score of 142. He made two centuries and 10 fifties and took 29 catches. He had a reputation as an excellent fielder.

In 1954 Bridger wrote an article for The Churchman titled "The Public School Chaplain's Job". In 1958 he became warden of Tyndale House, a biblical studies centre in Cambridge.

He died in a road accident at Burley, Hampshire, on 14 July 1986.

References

External links
John Bridger at Cricinfo
John Bridger at CricketArchive

1920 births
1986 deaths
People from Dulwich
People educated at Rugby School
Alumni of Clare College, Cambridge
English cricketers
Marylebone Cricket Club cricketers
Hampshire cricketers
Hampshire cricket captains
20th-century English clergy
Road incident deaths in England